Ley Matampi (born 18 April 1989) is a Congolese professional footballer who plays as a goalkeeper for FC Renaissance du Congo.

Honours 
TP Mazembe
Winner
 Linafoot (2): 2012, 2013

Runner-up
 CAF Confederation Cup: 2013

External links 
 
 

1989 births
Living people
Footballers from Kinshasa
Democratic Republic of the Congo footballers
Democratic Republic of the Congo international footballers
Association football goalkeepers
2017 Africa Cup of Nations players
2019 Africa Cup of Nations players
AS Vita Club players
Daring Club Motema Pembe players
TP Mazembe players
Kabuscorp S.C.P. players
Linafoot players
Al-Ansar FC (Medina) players
FC Renaissance du Congo players
Expatriate footballers in Angola
Expatriate footballers in Saudi Arabia
Democratic Republic of the Congo expatriates in Angola
Democratic Republic of the Congo expatriates in Saudi Arabia
Saudi First Division League players
21st-century Democratic Republic of the Congo people
Democratic Republic of the Congo A' international footballers
2011 African Nations Championship players
2016 African Nations Championship players